Mansky is a rural locality (a khutor) in Archedinskoye Rural Settlement, Frolovsky District, Volgograd Oblast, Russia. The population was 124 as of 2010.

Geography 
Mansky is located on the right bank of the Archeda River, 30 km east of Prigorodny (the district's administrative centre) by road. Obraztsy is the nearest rural locality.

References 

Rural localities in Frolovsky District